Der Große Stern (The Great Star) is the central square of the Großer Tiergarten park in Berlin; the Berlin Victory Column is sited in it.

Squares in Berlin
Tiergarten (park)